National Lampoon The Best of #5, subtitled "Sloppy Seconds", was an American humor book that was published in 1974. The book was a "special issue" of National Lampoon magazine, so it was sold on newsstands; however, it was put out in addition to the regular issues of the magazine.

The book is a "best-of", an anthology, a compilation of pieces that had already been published in the magazine, pieces that had been created by the National Lampoon's regular contributors.

References

 Listed on Mark's Very Large National Lampoon Site
 Amazon listing
 The cover can be seen at Library Thing

Best Of 5
1972 books